Shields' Station, also known as Shields' Tavern, is a historic building in Blaine, Tennessee, that is listed on the National Register of Historic Places.

A tavern was established at the site around 1830. It was acquired by Dr. Samuel Shields, who operated the property as a stagecoach stop, tavern, store, medical dispensary, and post office. It was an important stop for travelers until the 1860s.

References

Commercial buildings on the National Register of Historic Places in Tennessee
Buildings and structures completed in 1830
Buildings and structures in Grainger County, Tennessee
1830 establishments in Tennessee
National Register of Historic Places in Grainger County, Tennessee